Drew Fischer (born July 10, 1980) is a Canadian football referee who regularly officiates Major League Soccer games, and was approved for international matches in 2015.

Background 

Fischer was born and raised in Calgary, Alberta. As a teen in Calgary he began officiating to earn extra money. Fischer has been a professional referee since 2007. He was accredited to first-division games in North America in 2012 and has been FIFA referee since 2015, only one of three Canadians at the time. He has a degree in physics from the University of Calgary.

Refereeing career

Fischer has officiated several Canadian Championship matches since 2012. He officiated the finals of the Canadian Championship in 2013, 2016, and 2018. Fisher has also officiated several Major League Soccer matches since 2012. After obtaining FIFA status in 2015, Fischer was appointed to referee the 2015 CONCACAF Men's Under-17 Championship and the 2015 CONCACAF Men's Olympic Qualifying Championship. On June 23, 2017, it was announced that Fischer had been appointed to officiate in the 2017 CONCACAF Gold Cup. He was also appointed to be a Video Assistant Referee for the 2019 FIFA Women's World Cup in France. In 2019 the Canadian Premier League began play and Fischer was one of the referees appointed during the inaugural season.

Fischer has been involved in numerous high-profile tournaments and matches including: 

 Canadian Interuniversity Sport National Final – 2011 and 2013
 Amway Canadian Championship Final – 2012 and 2013
 CONCACAF Men’s U17 Championship 2015
 FIFA Men’s World Cup 2018 Qualifying
 CONCACAF Gold Cup 2017
 FIFA Men’s U17 World Cup Brazil 2019
 FIFA Women’s World Cup France 2019
 CONCACAF Gold Cup 2021
 FIFA Club World Cup Qatar 2020
 MLS Cup Final [VAR] – 2020
 Concacaf Nations League Final [VAR] – 2021
 FIFA Club World Cup UAE 2021
 FIFA Men’s World Cup 2022 Qualifying
 CONCACAF League Final (1st Leg)- 2022 
 MLS Cup Final [VAR] - 2022

On May 19, 2022, Fischer was announced as one of 24 Video Match Officials appointed by FIFA for the 2022 FIFA World Cup Qatar 2022

References

External links 
  (archive)

1980 births
Living people
Canadian soccer referees
CONCACAF Champions League referees
Major League Soccer referees
North American Soccer League referees
Soccer people from Alberta
Sportspeople from Calgary